Early Snow in Munich is a 1984 Yugoslav film directed by Bogdan Žižić.

External links

Early Snow in Munich at HRfilm.hr 

1984 films
Croatian drama films
Yugoslav drama films
Films directed by Bogdan Žižić